Germain Jousse (November 20, 1895 in Coulaines - March 21, 1988 in Monblanc), was a member of the French Resistance during the Second World War.

World War I

In 1914 Germain Jousse conscripted into the army. Promoted to second lieutenant in June 1915, he held the role of company commander from June 1916 and became lieutenant in November of the same year. Wounded at Saint-Dié on October 1, 1917, he rejoined his unit after one month of hospitalization having refused any recuperation. Promoted to captain in April 1918, he was decorated with the Légion d'honneur on the battlefield in September 1918, for having advanced to the position of Celles-sur-Aisne and for having destroyed an enemy company and capturing numerous prisoners.

Military career between the wars

In 1919, he was sent to Turkey with the 412th Regiment to fight the 'Kémalistes'. Wounded on May 1, 1921, he was made prisoner after hard combat and only returned to France in 1922. In 1925 he was allowed into the École supérieure de guerre, and he then served in Algeria. In 1935 he was promoted to major and transferred to Kabylie with the 9th Regiment of Zouaves until 1938. In August 1939 he joined his station of mobilization as Chief of the 3rd Office of the Staff of the Commander in chief of the Theatre of operations of North Africa. In June 1940  with the High Command, he vainly proposed various solutions for the continuation of the fight against Germany, which he considered possible in North Africa. He was then transferred, still as Chief of the 3rd Office to the Staff of the 19th Army Corps of Algiers.

Entry into resistance

In spring 1941, continuing to refuse defeat, he secretly took part in the establishment of a plan of allied intervention in North Africa, with some comrades from the circles of General Maxime Weygand and Marshal Philippe Pétain. Others like him such as Captain Beaufre and the commanders Dartois and Loustanau-Lacau were denounced, arrested and executed. He himself only just escaped from the same fate. Promoted to the rank of lieutenant-colonel in September 1941, he did not discontinue to work for the resistance in secret, by drawing up notes evaluating the technical bases for a future allied invasion of North Africa. In January 1942, he became military adviser to the Algiers resistant group directed by Henri d'Astier de la Vigerie and José Aboulker. In disgrace, under Vichy orders he was put in control of regulating supply transport bound for the Rommel army, in accordance with the agreements passed through the general delegation of Weygand and Germany (Dankworth Contract). He benefitted from it as he was able to provide information for the allied secret services, all the while endeavouring to slow down and block the transports bound for the Afrika Korps.

Contribution to the Putsch of November 8, 1942 and the Torch Operation

From, June 1942, appointed Garrison Major in Algiers, Colonel Jousse actively prepared for the Algiers uprising, storing weapons and contributing to choosing the locations which would be occupied. He himself took part in the execution of the November 8 Putsch and opposing the Vichyist 'plan of the maintenance of law and order' which was intended to be opposed to any invasion. Thus he would facilitate the occupation of strategic points by the resistance by providing them 'VP' arm-bands - 'Public Volunteers', with letters from the Public Commander destined for the military collaborationists, with mission orders to raise the state of security. He personally carried out the arrest of General Louis Koeltz, Commander of the Algerian 19th Army Corps, and went onto the battlefront to put an end to the fire of a resistance battalion protecting the invasion point of Sidi Ferruch for the American troops. The success of the putsch can be attributed to Germain Jousse, who allowed 400 armed civilians to arrest General Juin, Commander in chief, as well as the collaborationist Admiral Darlan, and who paralysed the mobilisation of the Vichyist 19th Army Corps during the 15 hours in which the Allied forces unloaded unopposed, encircled Algiers, and achieved surrender the same evening with its port intact.

The end of the war

Colonel Jousse participated in the Tunisian Campaign within the General British Staff from November 1942 to March 1943. In April he was named the Chief of the Staff of General Georges Catroux in Algiers. Then promoted to Colonel, he became assistant manager of the Staff of General Charles de Gaulle in Algiers. He was then assigned to the Directorate-General of Studies and Research (DGÉR), where he took command of the documentation service. In 1944, he accepted his stars as Brigade General, and in 1946 was promoted to Division General.

Career after the war

Thereafter Germain Jousse commanded the 5th Military Region in Toulon, and, in July 1952, was promoted to the rank of Army Corps General. He was, in addition, the first president of the Association of the French Liberation of November 8, 1942.

He died on March 21, 1988 in Monblanc in Gers. He was buried in Mans dans la Sarthe.

Decorations
His decorations were as follows:

Compagnon de la Libération (Membre du Conseil de l’Ordre)
Grand Croix de la Légion d'honneur 
Croix de Guerre 14/18
Croix de Guerre 39/45
Croix de Guerre des TOE.

Publications
General Jousse also published two works:

Considérations sur l'Armée de demain, Paris, 1946
L'Armée Nationale, Paris 1947

French Resistance members
1895 births
1988 deaths